Skudrinka (Macedonian: Скудринка) is a traditional Macedonian Oro, folk dance, from region of Dolna Reka, region along the river of Radika in western part of North Macedonia.

It is a dance with steady movements on half feet with jumps and turnings around. The dancers are holding for a stick that is placed between the dancers and hold their hands in horizontal position. They begin their dance in a position of a half circle. The dance rhythm is 2/4.

Video of the Skudrinka folk dance by the ensamble "Orce Nikolov" on YouTube, the Skudrinka dance begins around 5min after the beginning of the video

See also
Music of North Macedonia

Further reading
Dimovski, Mihailo. (1977:86-91). Macedonian folk dances (Original in Macedonian: Македонски народни ора). Skopje: Naša kniga & Institut za folklor

External links
The music of Skudrinka by Corvus Corax on YouTube 
The music of Skudrinka by Clamor et Gaudium on YouTube

Macedonian dances